James Theodore Inskip (6 April 1868 – 4 August 1949) was Bishop of Barking from 1919 to 1948.

Inskip was the son of James Inskip, a Bristol solicitor, by his first wife Elizabeth, daughter of Edward Thomas Inskip. Lord Chancellor Thomas Inskip, 1st Viscount Caldecote and Sir John Inskip, Lord Mayor of Bristol, were his younger half-brothers. Inskip's mother died when he was one year old. He was educated at Clifton College and Corpus Christi College, Cambridge. His youngest daughter was the novelist, Constance Elizabeth [Betty] Inskip.

Ordained in 1892, his first post was as a curate at St James’, Hatcham. He was then successively a lecturer in pastoral theology at King's College London, Vicar of Jesmond and  finally (before his elevation to the episcopate) Vicar of Christ Church, Southport. While Bishop of Barking, he also held the positions of Archdeacon of Essex (1920–1922) and Archdeacon of West Ham (1922–1948). Whilst bishop, Inskip lived first at Leyton, then in a large house bought by the diocese, Hillside, later the Gables, Albion Hill, Loughton.

References

External links

1868 births
Clergy from Bristol
People from Loughton
People educated at Clifton College
Alumni of Corpus Christi College, Cambridge
Academics of King's College London
Bishops of Barking
Archdeacons of Essex
1949 deaths